Willie Mullins (born September 30, 1980) is an American professional stock car racing owner-driver. He is currently scheduled to compete part-time in the ARCA Menards Series for his own team, Mullins Racing.

Racing career

Early racing career 
In 2006, he would win the SCCA V8 Grand National champion, along with receiving Rookie of the Year honors.

ARCA Menards Series 
Throughout 2008–2012, he would race one-off events at New Jersey Motorsports Park, receiving a best of 15th in 2011.

In 2016, using a car acquired from the defunct Yates Racing, he would earn a top 10 finish at the season-opener at Daytona International Speedway.

In 2018, he would score a major upset second-place at the season-opener.

In 2019, he would finish last at Daytona due to a crash on lap 3.

In 2020, he would partner his team with Fast Track Racing for two races that year.

In 2021, with equipment bought from the defunct KBR Development, he would manage another top-10 at Elko Speedway.

ARCA Menards Series East 
In 2020, he would run a one-off race at New Smyrna Speedway, finishing 20th.

In 2021, he would once again race a one-off at New Smyrna, earning a top-ten.

Personal life 
Mullins is the owner of Bugsy's Auto Body & Repair, which often sponsors him in his races. He has ducks that live in the pond on his property, and puts duck decals on his cars during races.

Motorsports career results

ARCA Menards Series 
(key) (Bold – Pole position awarded by qualifying time. Italics – Pole position earned by points standings or practice time. * – Most laps led.)

ARCA Menards Series East

References

External links 

 
 Mullins Racing website

1980 births
Living people
ARCA Menards Series drivers
NASCAR drivers
Racing drivers from Virginia
Sportspeople from Fredericksburg, Virginia